Burdino is a rural locality (a village) in Levinskoye Rural Settlement, Bolshesosnovsky District, Perm Krai, Russia. The population was 79 as of 2010. There are 4 streets.

Geography 
Burdino is located 24 km southeast of Bolshaya Sosnova (the district's administrative centre) by road. Dolgany is the nearest rural locality.

References 

Rural localities in Bolshesosnovsky District